Szolnoki Vízilabda Sport Club is a professional water polo team based Szolnok, Hungary. Founded in 1921, it plays in OB I, the top division championship in the country, which they won on nine occasions.

The club produced several of the most successful Hungarian water polo players, including Olympic champions Ottó Boros, István Hasznos, Tivadar Kanizsa and European champion István Pintér.

Naming history
 Szolnoki MÁV: (1921 – 1950)
 Szolnoki Dózsa: (1950 – 1973)
 Vízügy-Dózsa: (1973 – 1976)
 Szolnoki Vízügy SE: (1977 – 1990/91)
 Szolnoki Vízügy-RC Cola: (1991/92) - the first naming sponsor
 Elektrosoft SE Szolnok: (1992/93 – 1993/94)
 Szolnoki VSE: (1994/95 – 1995/96)
 Szolnoki MTE: (1996/97 – 1997/98)
 Szolnoki VSC: (1998/99 – 2005/06)
 Szolnoki Főiskola VSC: (2006/07 – 2007/08)
 Szolnoki Főiskola-KÖZGÉP: (2008/09 – 2010/11)
 Szolnoki Dózsa-KÖZGÉP: (2011/12 – 2016/17)
 Szolnoki Dózsa: (2017/18 – ... )

Honours

Domestic competitions 
Országos Bajnokság I (National Championship of Hungary)
 Champions (10): 1954, 1957, 1958, 1959, 1961, 1964, 2014–15, 2015–16, 2016–17, 2020–21

Magyar Kupa (National Cup of Hungary)
 Winners (6): 1966, 1968, 1985, 2014, 2016, 2017
{{small| Finalist (4): 1954, 2012, 2013, 2015, 2020}}

Szuperkupa (Super Cup of Hungary)
 Winners (2): 2016, 2017

 European competitions 
LEN Champions League
Winners (1): 2016–17
LEN Euro Cup
Winners (1): 2020–21Quarter-finalist (1): 2012–13
LEN Super Cup
Winners (1): 2017

Current squad
Season 2022–23

Staff
Technical staff
 Head Coach:  Zoltán Hangay
 Assistant Coach:  Róbert Hangay
 Fitness Coach:  Gergő Vincze

Management
 Technical Director:  István Kovács
 Club Director:  Beáta Ujszászi

Transfers (2017-18)
Source: vizipolo.hu

 In:
 Bence Bátori (from Orvosegyetem) Miloš Ćuk (from Eger) Gergő Zalánki (from Orvosegyetem) Out:
 Ugo Crousillat (to Pays d'Aix) Dénes Varga (to Ferencváros) Márton Vámos (to Ferencváros)Recent seasons

 Remained in the league due to the resignation of other teams to play in the league.
 Cancelled due to the COVID-19 pandemic.

In European competition
Participations in Champions League (European Cup, Euroleague): 8x
Participations in Euro Cup (LEN Cup): 2x
Participations in Cup Winners' Cup: 1xNotable former players

Olympic champions

  Ottó Boros (1948–1950, 1952–1964)
  Tibor Cservenyák (1958–1972)
  István Hasznos (1934–1943, 1947–1961)
  Norbert Hosnyánszky (2014–2016)
  Tivadar Kanizsa (1954–1964)
  Gábor Kis (2011–2019)
  Norbert Madaras (2014–2016)
  Dániel Varga (2014–2016)
  Dénes Varga (2014–2017)
  Tamás Varga (junior years)
  Milan Aleksić (2012–2019)
  Miloš Ćuk (2017–2018)
  Filip Filipović (2020–2021)
  Živko Gocić (2011–2018)
  Stefan Mitrović (2013–2016)
  Duško Pijetlović (2019–2021)
  Andrija Prlainović (2016–2019)

Former coaches

 József Vértesy 
 Miklós Czapkó ( –1965)
 Tivadar Kanizsa (1966–75)
 
 Mihály Mayer (1987–90)
 Péter Wolf (1993–94)
 Zoltán Mohi (1999–00)
 Lajos Urbán (2001–03)
 Dénes Lukács (2003– )
 
 Sándor Cseh ( –2012)
 István Kovács (2012–14)
 Sándor Cseh (2014–18) 
  Živko Gocić (2018– present'')

References

External links
 

Szolnok
Water polo clubs in Hungary
Sports clubs established in 1921
1921 establishments in Hungary